Revenge Body with Khloé Kardashian is an American reality television series starring Khloé Kardashian that premiered on the E! cable network, on January 12, 2017. Announced on December 16, 2015, the series features two people in each episode who get a makeover using assistance of personal trainers and stylists leading to a "major transformation inside and out". A special preview episode aired on November 23, 2016. On April 18, 2017, E! renewed the show for a second season which premiered on January 7, 2018. On May 3, 2019, E! renewed the show for a third season, which premiered on July 7, 2019.

Episodes

Series overview

Season 1 (2017)

Season 2 (2018)

Season 3 (2019)

Broadcast 
Internationally, the series debuted in Australia, Europe and Asia in simulcast with the American premiere on January 13, 2017.
It was broadcast in Australia on E! (FOXTEL).

International versions 
Greece: Open TV bought the rights of Revenge Body for Greece and Cyprus and announced a Greek language adaptation, which premiered on March 16, 2019. It was presented by Ioanna Lili.

See also 

 Kocktails with Khloé

References

External links 
 
 

2017 American television series debuts
American television spin-offs
English-language television shows
E! original programming
Makeover reality television series
Reality television spin-offs
Television series by Lionsgate Television
Television series by Ryan Seacrest Productions